Scott Taylor is an Australian writer.

In the mid 1990s he was script producer and story editor on Neighbours.

Working for Fremantle Media he helped develop the show Na Wspólnej.

Select Credits
Neighbours - story editor (1996–97), script producer, writer
Home and Away - story editor (1998–99, 2010), writer

References

External links

Australian television writers
Living people
Year of birth missing (living people)
Australian male television writers